Rehutai Maihi (16 September 1895 – 1967) was a New Zealand tribal leader, journalist, newspaper publisher and editor, political candidate, community leader. Of Māori descent, she identified with the Nga Puhi iwi. She was born in Whakapara, Northland, New Zealand on 16 September 1895.

References

1895 births
1967 deaths
New Zealand publishers (people)
Ngāpuhi people
New Zealand Māori writers
20th-century New Zealand politicians
20th-century New Zealand journalists